Hyperolius rubrovermiculatus is a species of frog in the family Hyperoliidae. It is endemic to Kenya. Its natural habitats are subtropical or tropical dry forests, moist savanna, swamps, intermittent freshwater marshes, rural gardens, and heavily degraded former forest. It is threatened by habitat loss.

Description 

Males are usually  and females .

References

rubrovermiculatus
Endemic fauna of Kenya
Taxa named by Arne Schiøtz
Amphibians described in 1975
Taxonomy articles created by Polbot